Hieracium ravidum is a species of flowering plant belonging to the family Asteraceae.

Its native range is Sweden.

References

ravidum